The National Hindu Students' Forum (NHSF (UK)) is a network of Hindu societies operating on university and further education campuses in the United Kingdom. The NHSF (UK) was started in 1991 from a stall at a Hindu marathon, but now operates in around 50 different institutions around the United Kingdom. The NHSF has been described by historian Edward Anderson as having ties to the Sangh Parivar, a group of Hindu nationalist organisations in India such as the RSS and the BJP.

References

External links
 NHSF (UK) website

Educational organisations based in the United Kingdom
Religious charities based in the United Kingdom
Hindu organisations based in the United Kingdom
1991 establishments in the United Kingdom
Religious organizations established in 1991